Kerim Alıcı (born 24 June 1997) is a Turkish professional footballer who plays as a right-back for Turkish club Hatayspor.

Career
Alıcı beg1an his career with Altınordu, and signed a contract with Göztepe on 2 October 2020, and briefly went to Boluspor on loan. Alıcı made his professional debut with Göztepe in a 3-2 Süper Lig win over Konyaspor on 16 January 2021.

Personal life
Alıcı is the twin brother of the footballer Barış Alıcı.

References

External links

1997 births
People from Bornova
Twin sportspeople
Living people
Turkish footballers
Turkey youth international footballers
Turkey under-21 international footballers
Association football fullbacks
Altınordu F.K. players
Göztepe S.K. footballers
Boluspor footballers
Hatayspor footballers
Süper Lig players
TFF First League players
Footballers from İzmir